Mordellistena badia is a beetle in the genus Mordellistena of the family Mordellidae. It was described in 1945 by Liljeblad.

References

badia
Beetles described in 1945